Scutigera argentina is a species of centipede in the family Scutigeridae.

References 

 Meinert, F. (1886). Myriapoda Musei Cantabrigensis, Mass. Part I. Chilopoda. Proceedings of the American Philosophical Society, 161-233.

External links 
 

Animals described in 1870
Scutigeromorpha